In 1960, Ford Canada introduced the Frontenac to give Mercury-Meteor dealers a compact vehicle to sell. It was a separate marque, like Lincoln was to Ford. Produced for the 1960 model year only, the Frontenac was essentially a 1960 Ford Falcon with its own unique grille, tail lights, and external trim, including red maple-leaf insignia. It was the second-best selling compact in Canada during its one year (5% of Ford's total Canadian output). 

A total of 9,536 Frontenacs were built at its Oakville, Ontario, plant. In August 1960 a prototype 1961 Frontenac was driven from Halifax to Vancouver for a photo shoot only for the crew to learn that the Canadian model was discontinued from the domestic market and replaced by the Comet for the 1961 model year.

At launch the Frontenac was available in 2-door and 4-door sedan body styles with 2-door and 4-door station wagons added later.

The Frontenac is one example of U.S. automakers' attempts to market slight variations of U.S. models as unique Canadian makes. Like the Monarch and Meteor brands marketed by the Ford Motor Company of Canada, the Frontenac was not part of the Ford or Mercury lines. It was its own marque, and was marketed as such. 

The Frontenac was named after a late 17th century governor of New France. The name had been used previously, from 1931 to 1933, on a car assembled in Toronto by Dominion Motors.

Model Information

Further reading

References

External links
 1960 Frontenac at Old Cars Canada
 Frontenac brochures

Cars of Canada
Ford Motor Company of Canada
Vehicles introduced in 1960
Frontenac
Compact cars
Coupés
Sedans
Station wagons
Rear-wheel-drive vehicles
1960s cars
Ford Motor Company Marques